The Kentucky Wesleyan Panthers are the athletic teams that represent Kentucky Wesleyan College, located in Owensboro, Kentucky, in intercollegiate sports as a member of the Division II level of the National Collegiate Athletic Association (NCAA). 

KWU competes in 22 intercollegiate varsity sports, listed below:

Basketball 

The men's basketball team advanced to the Division II championship game six consecutive years (1998–2003), winning in 1999 and 2001.  In addition to these most recent successes, they also won six other championships (1966, 1968, 1969, 1973, 1987, and 1990) and were runners-up in 1957. Overall, Kentucky Wesleyan has won eight NCAA Division II National Men's Basketball Championships, which is the most by any NCAA Division II School.

Football 

Kentucky Wesleyan has an American football team, which competes in the Division II Great Midwest Athletic Conference.

History
The Panthers primarily compete in the Great Midwest Athletic Conference (G-MAC), as a founding member since the 2013–14 academic year. The Panthers previously competed as a charter member of the Great Lakes Valley Conference (GLVC) from 1978–79 to 2011–12 (but was fulfilling its commitments to the final year of competition for its other sports in the GLVC as a full member for the 2012–13 school year; before beginning competition as a full G-MAC member). They also competed in the Kentucky Intercollegiate Athletic Conference (KIAC; now currently known as the River States Conference (RSC) since the 2016–17 school year) of the National Association of Intercollegiate Athletics (NAIA) from 1916–17 to 1954–55.

Kentucky Wesleyan's GLVC championship teams
Kentucky Wesleyan's athletic teams have won eighteen (18) Great Lakes Valley Conference (GLVC) championships.  The KWC softball team won as total of four GLVC Championships, three in the 1980s (1984, 1986, and 1989) and one in 1994. The KWC men's golf team won its only GLVC championship in 1983.  The KWC men's basketball team has won 13 GLVC championships.

References